The Nitra Region is one of the administrative regions of Slovakia. It was first established in 1923 and from 1996 exists in its present borders. It consists of seven districts and 354 municipalities, from which 16 have a town status. The economy of the region focuses more on agriculture, than in other Slovak regions. Nitra is its seat, largest city, and cultural and economic center.

Geography
This region with a long history is situated in the southwest of Slovakia, mostly in the eastern part of the Danubian Lowland. It is divided into two sub-units: the Danubian Flat in the south-west, with eastern part of the Žitný ostrov island, and the Danubian Hills in the north, centre and east. Mountain ranges reaching into the region are: Považský Inovec in the north-west, where the region's highest point, Veľký Inovec, is located, Tribeč in the north from Nitra, Pohronský Inovec in the north-east and Štiavnické vrchy in the east. Major rivers are the Danube in the south, Váh in the south-west, Nitra in the western-central part, Hron in the east and Ipeľ in the south-east. As for administrative divisions, the region borders Trenčín Region in the north, Banská Bystrica Region in the east, Hungarian Pest in the south-east, Komárom-Esztergom in the south, and Győr-Moson-Sopron county in the south-west and Trnava Region in the west.

Demographics

The largest towns are Nitra, Komárno, Nové Zámky and Levice. According to the 2001 census, there were 713,422 inhabitants in the region, with a majority of Slovaks (68.3%), but there is a numerous Hungarian minority (27.6%) in the southern districts, forming a majority in the Komárno District (72%) and there are small minorities of Czechs and Roma (<1%).

Economy and climate
The city of Nitra is also the centre of whole region. The region - which is the warmest in Slovakia - reaches a high production of wheat, rye and vegetables. Significant industries are: the food industry, with breweries in Topoľčany, Nitra and Hurbanovo, are machinery (fridges in Zlaté Moravce, shipyards in Komárno) and energy (Mochovce Nuclear Power Plant).

Politics
Current governor of Banská Bystrica region is Milan Belica (Smer-SD). He won with 34,1 %. In election 2017 was elected also regional parliament :

2017 elections
In governor's elections won Milan Belica (Smer–SD) over many another candidates.

2013 elections

In governor's elections won Milan Belica (Smer–SD) over centre-right candidate Tomáš Galbavý (SDKÚ–DS), who was supported by SaS, OKS, NOVA, Most–Híd, SMK-MKP.

|-
| colspan="6" |
|-
|- style="background-color:#C0DBFC; text-align:center;"
! colspan="3" style="text-align:left;" | Parties and coalitions
! %
! Seats
! +/-
|-
| rowspan="2" style="background-color:;border-bottom-style:hidden;" |
| style="background-color:;"|
| style="text-align:left;"| Social Democrats
| 35.19
| 19
| 4
|-
| style="background-color:#fdfd96;"|
| style="text-align:left;"| Christian Democrats
| 24.07
| 13
| 6
|-
|- style="background-color:; color:white;"
| colspan="3" style="text-align:left;"| 
| 59.26
| 32
| 10
|-
| rowspan="1" style="background-color:;border-bottom-style:hidden;" |
| style="background-color:"|
| style="text-align:left;"| SMK–MKP
| 25.93
| 14
|  1
|-
|- style="background-color:; color:white;"
| colspan="3" style="text-align:left;"| 
| 25.93
| 14
| 1
|-
| rowspan="1" style="background-color:;border-bottom-style:hidden;" |
| style="background-color:"|
| style="text-align:left;"| Independets
| 7.41
| 4
| 1
|-
|- style="background-color:; color:white;"
| colspan="3" style="text-align:left;"| 
| 7.41
| 4
| 1
|-
| rowspan="3" style="background-color:;border-bottom-style:hidden;" |
| style="background-color:"|
| style="text-align:left;"| SDKÚ–DS
| 1.85
| 1
|  8
|-
| style="background-color:"|
| style="text-align:left;"| Most–Híd
| 1.85
| 1
| 1
|-
| style="background-color:"|
| style="text-align:left;"| NOVA
| 1.85
| 1
| 1
|-
|- style="background-color:; color:white;"
| colspan="3" style="text-align:left;"| 
| 5.55
| 3
| 6
|-
| rowspan="1" style="background-color:;border-bottom-style:hidden;" |
| style="background-color:"|
| style="text-align:left;"| Nationalists
| 1.85
| 1
| 1
|-
|- style="background-color:; color:white;"
| colspan="3" style="text-align:left;"| 
| 1.85
| 1
| 1
|}

2009 elections

In governor's elections won Milan Belica (Smer–SD), who was supported by SDKÚ–DS and KDH.

2005 elections

In governor's elections won Milan Belica, who was supported by ASV, KSS, ĽB, ĽS–HZDS, PSNS, ZSNS. His rival in second round of elections was Ján Greššo (DS, SDKÚ).

2001 elections

In governor's elections won Milan Belica, who was supported by HZDS, SOP, SDĽ and Centre party. His rival in second round of elections was Miklós Fehér (SMK-MKP).

Administrative divisions
The Nitra Region consists of 7 districts. There are 354 municipalities, of which 16 are towns.

See also
Nyitra County of the Kingdom of Hungary

References

External links
Nitriansky samosprávny kraj Official website

 
Regions of Slovakia
1923 establishments in Slovakia